Blooming Rose or Bloomingrose may refer to:

Blooming Rose, Missouri
Bloomingrose, West Virginia